Eugene Ashe is a film maker and director from Harlem, New York. Ashe grew up in Harlem, New York. His background includes working as a musician as part of the R & B band Funky Poets.

Filmography
Sylvie's Love (2020)
Homecoming (2012)

References

21st-century American screenwriters
Film directors from New York City
Living people
Year of birth missing (living people)
Screenwriters from New York (state)
People from Harlem
21st-century American male writers
American male screenwriters